Thomas Humber (16 October 1841 – 24 November 1910) was a British engineer and cycle manufacturer who developed and patented a safety bicycle (1884) with a diamond-shaped frame and wheels of similar  size. It became a pattern for subsequent machines. Humber made many other improvements to bicycles. About 1868 he founded Humber Cycles, the bicycle manufacturing business at Beeston, Nottinghamshire later owned by Humber & Co Limited.

Humber improved cycle technology through the independence of his thinking and his practical ability. The reliability of his products arose from his high standards and emphasis on quality. It all led to Humber becoming regarded as the aristocrat among bicycles.

Early life
Thomas Humber was born on Andrew Street, Brightside, Sheffield on 16 October 1841 the son of Samuel Humber, a tailor, and his wife Lucy. His parents moved to Kingston upon Hull when he was 5 years old and he attended the Salthouse Lane school. On leaving school he worked for a blacksmith William Campion. In 1854 the family moved again this time to Nottingham. About 1860 he went over to Alfreton Derbyshire and The Butterley Company where he impressed his employers by devising a more efficient method of building deck beams for the Royal Navy's ships.  But he soon returned to Nottingham and set himself up there as a blacksmith and there, in 1863, he married Emma Elizabeth Freeman (c. 1842-1903). They were to have a daughter and a son.

Humber cycles

Velocipede
Thomas Humber built himself a velocipede based on a picture in a letter about the Paris-developed machine that was published in the English Mechanic magazine in late 1868. It took him time to work out how to ride it but in the end he did manage to make the six miles from Nottingham to Radcliffe. He sold it and made an improved version—bought by the same buyer. It took him 2 months to make each velocipede, he was concerned to develop improvements: solid rubber tyres, ball-bearings, while maintaining quality and reliability. He instituted races to win public interest.

Ordinary or "Penny-farthing"

Thomas's own design of "ordinary", now commonly known as a "penny-farthing", appeared in 1871 and not long after James Starley's metal ordinary. His first price-list contained a testimonial by Fred Cooper, a racing cyclist. Another racing contact was Thomas Marriott.

Marriott joined Thomas Humber as a business partner in 1875 and Fred Cooper joined them two years later. They named their new firm Humber, Marriott & Cooper.

Their staff of 80 or so needed more factory space so they built them a new works at Beeston.

Change partners

It seemed Thomas's technical abilities were not matched by his business acumen. Cooper and Marriott left the firm in 1885 but he let them have equal rights to the name Humber. He also let them use the old partnership's patents. They set themselves up as cycle wholesalers but later they got Rudge of Coventry to make the cycles for them.

Now free, Thomas Humber got the backing of Nottingham lace bleacher dyer and finisher, T Harrison Lambert, and took charge of the whole business and its Beeston works. Lambert, father of A. J. Alan, was a cycle-racing friend building a reputation as a successful company promoter. Humber and Lambert opened a factory in Coventry in 1886.

By 1887 the cycle industry was consolidating and Humber and company promoter Lambert sold their business to investors who added a number of other substantial cycle manufacturers and then floated the new combine on the stock exchange. Such was the public's recognition of Humber products and their high quality and reliability the whole new organisation was named Humber & Co Limited though Humber's was not the largest component. Thomas Humber agreed to manage the whole enterprise with its works in Coventry and Wolverhampton as well as Beeston.

Thomas Humber retired in 1892 at the end of his 5-year contract. Following financial difficulties, an outcome of the slump of 1898-1899, Humber & Co Limited's business was transferred to a new incorporation named Humber Limited.

Retirement
Thomas Humber then involved himself in the development of the pneumatic tyre and floated Beeston Pneumatic Tyre Company Limited. With Lambert he had other business interests. His old company took him to court in 1896 after his involvement in British Motor Syndicate Limited became public insisting on enforcing his agreement to not become a director of a business in a related field.

Lambert remained a director of Humber and its foreign subsidiaries and joined boards of industrial businesses including Watney breweries, by then the largest brewer in London, and Watney subsidiaries in USA. However Lambert's dealings in cycle company shares brought him into association with Ernest Terah Hooley and into bankruptcy in 1900.

Thomas's wife had unsuccessfully petitioned for divorce in 1886. Emma died on 8 August 1903. Thomas married Eleanor Robinson, 30 years his junior, in Paddington on 9 September 1903. They moved to Kingston upon Thames and Thomas died there 24 November 1910 aged 69.

Cycle racing
In 1891 Charles Terront won the world's first long distance race, Paris–Brest–Paris, riding a Humber bicycle fitted with prototype removable pneumatic tyres made by Michelin.

Note

References

1841 births
1910 deaths
English philanthropists
Businesspeople from Sheffield
British cycle designers
Engineers from Yorkshire
19th-century British philanthropists
Sustainable transport pioneers
19th-century English businesspeople